Vitali Viktorovich Litvinov (born 17 November 1970) is a former Russian professional footballer.

Club career
He made his professional debut in the Soviet Second League in 1991 for FC Progress Chernyakhovsk.

Honours
 Russian Premier League bronze: 2000.
 Top-33 year-end best players list: 2000.

European club competitions
 UEFA Intertoto Cup 1996 with FC Uralmash Yekaterinburg: 5 games, 3 goals.
 UEFA Cup 2000–01 with FC Torpedo Moscow: 2 games, 1 goal.

References

1970 births
Footballers from Saint Petersburg
Living people
Soviet footballers
Russian footballers
Association football midfielders
Association football defenders
FC Ural Yekaterinburg players
FC Elista players
FC Torpedo Moscow players
FC Torpedo-2 players
FC Moscow players
FC Dynamo Saint Petersburg players
FC Dynamo Bryansk players
Russian Premier League players